Marco Gori (born 26 July 1979) is an Italian association footballer.

Gori made his Serie A debut on 8 March 1998 against A.S. Bari.

External links
http://www.gazzetta.it/speciali/serie_b/2008_nw/giocatori/54469.shtml
https://web.archive.org/web/20081206063637/http://www.uscremonese.it/archivio/20082009/squadra_20082009/marco_gori.html

Italian footballers
Empoli F.C. players
A.C. Prato players
A.C. Monza players
U.C. AlbinoLeffe players
U.S. Cremonese players
Serie A players
Association football midfielders
Footballers from Florence
1979 births
Living people